Andrea Horwath (born October 24, 1962) is a Canadian politician who has been the 58th mayor of Hamilton since 2022. Horwath previously served as the member of Provincial Parliament (MPP) for Hamilton Centre from 2004 to 2022, as leader of the Ontario New Democratic Party (NDP) from 2009 to 2022 and as the leader of the Official Opposition in Ontario from 2018 to 2022.

She was the first woman to lead the Ontario New Democratic Party, and the third woman (after Lyn McLeod and Kathleen Wynne) to serve as leader of a political party with representation in the Ontario provincial legislature, being elected as leader at the 2009 Ontario NDP leadership convention.

During the 2018 provincial election, Horwath led the Ontario NDP to official opposition status after 23 years without government or official opposition status.

The results of the 2022 provincial election, after which the Ontario NDP remained the official opposition, led to Horwath announcing her intention to resign as the leader of the Ontario NDP on the night of June 2, 2022. Her resignation took effect on June 28, 2022.

On July 26, 2022, Horwath announced her candidacy for mayor of Hamilton, and resigned her seat in the provincial legislature on August 15, 2022. She was elected mayor on October 24, 2022, and was inaugurated on November 16.

Early life, education, early career
Horwath was born and raised in Hamilton, Ontario, and has a Bachelor of Arts degree in Labour Studies from McMaster University. She worked part-time as a waitress to pay her way through university. Her father Andrew, an ethnic Hungarian, had immigrated to Canada from Slovakia, and worked on the assembly line at the Ford Motor Company plant in Oakville, Ontario. Her mother, Diane, is of French and Irish descent.

She lives in Hamilton with her son Julian (born November 1992). In a March 2011 interview with the Toronto Star, she spoke publicly for the first time about the breakup of her longtime relationship with Julian's father, Hamilton businessman Ben Leonetti. Horwath had met Ben Leonetti in her university years, when she was working part-time as a waitress and he was a jazz musician. The two lived together for 25 years without getting married and split up in 2010.

Early political career
In the Canadian federal election of 1997, she was the NDP candidate against incumbent Liberal Stan Keyes in the riding of Hamilton West. Although unsuccessful, her second-place finish was a significant improvement on previous NDP efforts in the riding, and gave her an increased level of prominence in the city.

City councillor
Later in 1997, she was elected to Hamilton City Council for Ward Two, outpolling two incumbents who had represented the area for more than 20 years. She emerged as a prominent voice for the political left in the city, and was re-elected to council in 2000 and 2003. During her three terms as city councillor, she chaired the solid-waste-management committee and the municipal non-profit housing corporation.

Provincial politics

By-election victory
Horwath was elected to the Legislative Assembly of Ontario in a 2004 by-election in the then-extant provincial riding of Hamilton East, defeating Liberal candidate Ralph Agostino to succeed the deceased Liberal member Dominic Agostino, Ralph's brother. Winning 63.6 per cent of the vote, up from the NDP's 29.4 per cent in that riding six months earlier, her landslide victory boosted the NDP's seat count over the threshold for official party status in the legislature, and helped give the federal New Democratic Party a bounce in Hamilton that would continue into the federal election shortly thereafter.

2007 election
In the 2007 election, Horwath ran in the new riding of Hamilton Centre, due to redistricting that divided her former Hamilton East riding between Hamilton Centre and the new riding of Hamilton East—Stoney Creek. Horwath's new Hamilton Centre riding included approximately half of her former riding as well as a portion of the former Hamilton West riding where she had run federally in 1997. It also included her entire former city council ward.

In the lead up to the campaign, Horwath was expected to face Hamilton West Liberal incumbent Judy Marsales. However, Marsales opted not to run for another term, and Horwath easily defeated Liberal candidate Steve Ruddick on election day.

2009 NDP leadership campaign

On November 7, 2008, Horwath officially launched her campaign to win the party's leadership. The leadership election was held March 6–8, 2009. Horwath led on the first two ballots, and won on the third ballot with 60.4% of the vote defeating Peter Tabuns, Gilles Bisson and Michael Prue.

2011 election
The 2011 provincial election saw a rise in support for the NDP under Horwath's leadership. The party won more than 20% of the popular vote for the first time since 1995 and almost doubled its seats to elect 17 members of the legislature. The election also resulted in the Liberal government of Dalton McGuinty being reduced to a minority government with the NDP holding the balance of power.

In April 2012, Horwath passed a leadership review at the party's convention with 76% support.

2014 election

In the 2014 provincial election, the NDP was able to maintain its seat count of 21 at dissolution despite the loss of three seats in Toronto, but lost the balance of power when the Liberals took a majority win in the election. Horwath has faced criticism from some party members and progressives for running a populist campaign which they described as right-wing. Despite criticism of her leadership from some quarters, Horwath received a slightly increased level of support, 77%, at the party's post-election convention held on November 15.

2018 election
Horwath ran in her third election as NDP leader against the Liberal government led by Kathleen Wynne and a Progressive Conservative Party led by Doug Ford. Horwath promised to introduce "Canada's first universal Pharmacare plan", highlighted by a universal dental plan and a prescription drug plan that "will initially cover 125 of the most commonly prescribed drugs". She also promised a child care plan in which seventy per cent of Ontario parents "would either have free child care or pay an average of $12 a day in a licensed not-for-profit daycare". Horwath promised to return Hydro One to public ownership by buying back privately held shares. She also said that she would close the Pickering Nuclear Generating Station immediately, while the other party leaders have pledged to keep it open until 2024. The NDP promised to increase corporate tax rates from 11.5 to 12.5 per cent, as well as introducing an income tax increase for those earning over $220,000 per year. Horwath said the province would fund half of the operating cost of municipal transit and indicated that she would not introduce back-to-work legislation. The party's support in public opinion polls increased in May 2018, leading to greater media attention and greater scrutiny. With her party gaining official opposition status, she became the Leader of the Official Opposition during the 42nd Parliament, the second highest number of seats in the party's history. The NDP took all of old Toronto (i.e., what was the city of Toronto before the 1999 creation of the "megacity" of Toronto), as well as all but one seat in Hamilton and all but one seat in Niagara.

2022 election

Horwath and the NDP released their 2022 platform in April 2022. Horwath was re-elected in Hamilton Centre, but the NDP lost 7 seats. Horwath resigned as leader election night.

Return to municipal politics

Horwath ran as a candidate for the position of Mayor of Hamilton, Ontario in the October 2022 Hamilton, Ontario municipal election. She was elected on October 24, 2022. Horwath is the first woman to be elected mayor in Hamilton's history.

Mayor of Hamilton
Horwath took office as mayor on November 15, 2022, becoming the first woman to serve as mayor of the city of Hamilton. Prior to amalgamation the suburbs of Stoney Creek and Ancaster each had had women mayors. The first regional chair for the Region of Hamilton-Wentworth was also a woman.

Awards
In March 2012, Horwath received the EVE award which is sponsored by Equal Voice, a non-profit organization focused on promoting women in politics. Past recipients have included women from every level of government.

Electoral record

Provincial

Municipal

|-
!rowspan="2" colspan="2"|Candidate
!colspan="3"|Popular vote
!rowspan="2" colspan="2"|Expenditures
|-
! Votes
! %
! ±%
|-
| style="background-color:#4714a0 |
| style="text-align:left;" | Andrea Horwath
| style="text-align:centre;" | 59,216 
| style="text-align:centre;" | 41.68
| style="text-align:centre;" |
| style="text-align:centre;" |
|-
| style="background-color:#a1df02 |
| style="text-align:left;" | Keanin Loomis
| style="text-align:centre;" | 57,553
| style="text-align:centre;" | 40.41
| style="text-align:centre;" | 
| style="text-align:centre;" |
|-
| style="background-color:#f8db62 |
| style="text-align:left;" | Bob Bratina
| style="text-align:centre;" | 17,436
| style="text-align:centre;" | 12.27
| style="text-align:centre;" |
| style="text-align:centre;" |
|-
| style="background-color:#D88110 |
| style="text-align:left;" | Ejaz Butt
| style="text-align:centre;" | 1,907
| style="text-align:centre;" |1.34
| style="text-align:centre;" |
| style="text-align:centre;" |
|-
| style="background-color:#FFFFFF |
| style="text-align:left;" | Solomon Ikhuiwu
| style="text-align:centre;" | 1,867
| style="text-align:centre;" | 1.31
| style="text-align:centre;" |
| style="text-align:centre;" |
|-
| style="background-color:#FFFFFF |
| style="text-align:left;" | Jim Davis
| style="text-align:centre;" | 1,433
| style="text-align:centre;" | 1.01
| style="text-align:centre;" |
| style="text-align:centre;" |
|-
| style="background-color:#FFFFFF |
| style="text-align:left;" | Michael Pattison
| style="text-align:centre;" | 1,422
| style="text-align:centre;" | 1.00
| style="text-align:centre;" |
| style="text-align:centre;" |
|-
| style="background-color:#FFFFFF |
| style="text-align:left;" | Paul Fromm
| style="text-align:centre;" | 898
| style="text-align:centre;" | 0.63
| style="text-align:centre;" |
| style="text-align:centre;" |

|-
| style="background-color:#FFFFFF |
| style="text-align:left;" | Hermiz Ishaya
| style="text-align:centre;" | 326
| style="text-align:centre;" | 0.23
| style="text-align:centre;" |
| style="text-align:centre;" |

|-
| style="text-align:right;background-color:#FFFFFF;" colspan="2" |Total votes
| style="text-align:right;background-color:#FFFFFF;" |
| style="text-align:right;background-color:#c2c2c2;" colspan="3" |
|-
| style="text-align:right;background-color:#FFFFFF;" colspan="2" |Registered voters
| style="text-align:right;background-color:#FFFFFF;" |
| style="text-align:right;background-color:#FFFFFF;" |
| style="text-align:right;background-color:#FFFFFF;" |
| style="text-align:right;background-color:#c2c2c2;" |
|-
| style="text-align:left;" colspan="6" |Note: All Hamilton Municipal Elections are officially non-partisan.  Note: Candidate campaign colours are based on the prominent colour used in campaign items (signs, literature, etc.)and are used as a visual differentiation between candidates.
|-
| style="text-align:left;" colspan="13" |Sources: City of Hamilton, "Nominated Candidates"
|}

Federal

References

Notes:

External links

 Andrea Horwath
 

1962 births
Canadian people of Hungarian descent
Canadian people of Irish descent
Canadian abortion-rights activists
Women municipal councillors in Canada
Canadian community activists
Female Canadian political party leaders
Mayors of Hamilton, Ontario
Leaders of the Ontario New Democratic Party
Living people
McMaster University alumni
Ontario New Democratic Party MPPs
Women MPPs in Ontario
Franco-Ontarian people
Women mayors of places in Ontario
21st-century Canadian politicians
21st-century Canadian women politicians